Bear Creek Secondary School (also known as BCSS) is a public secondary school (grades 9-12) located in Barrie, Ontario, Canada. It was founded in 2001, it is the second largest high school in Simcoe County and currently has an enrollment of more than 1500 students. The current principal is Jeremy Oxley. The school has an extremely large catchment area of mainly south & west Barrie, but also portions of Essa Township and Springwater Township.

Facilities

The construction of Bear Creek was completed January 2001 by Bondfield Construction for the Simcoe County District School Board, costing CAD18,100,000. It was designed by Zawadzki Armin Stevens Architects. The school also features specialized classrooms, a round cafetorium, a food court area, and a large forum. Exterior features include a large parking area, an outdoor track and a large sports/football field. Nine years later, in 2010, a one-storey,  area expansion added six new classrooms, including two woodshops, a dance studio, and a hospitality suite, amongst other facilities. The CAD7.5 million expansion budget also covered renovations to the original part of the school.

Notable faculty
Lance Chomyc, former Toronto Argonaut and football record holder (In 1991, he set a record of 236 points)

Notable alumni 

 Daniel (Danny) Vandervoort, Edmonton Elks wide receiver. Drafted in the 2017 CFL draft 3rd overall

See also
List of high schools in Ontario

References

External links

Bear Creek Secondary School

High schools in Barrie
Educational institutions established in 2001
2001 establishments in Ontario